Woody Bay may refer to:

 Woody Bay, Devon, England
 Woody Bay, Isle of Wight, England
 Woody Bay, Newfoundland and Labrador, Canada

See also
 Woody Bay railway station, Devon, England